Anachis pardalis is a species of sea snail, a marine gastropod mollusk in the family Columbellidae, the dove snails.

Description
The length of the shell attains 7 mm.

Distribution
This species occurs in the Pacific Ocean from Costa Rica to Ecuador

References

 * Hinds, R. B. "On new species of Pleurotoma, Clavatula, and Mangelia." Proceedings of the Zoological society of London. Vol. 11. 1843.

External links
 
 H. A. Pilsbry and H. N. Lowe, West Mexican and Central American Mollusks Collected by H. N. Lowe, 1929-31; Proceedings of the Academy of Natural Sciences of Philadelphia Vol. 84 (1932), pp. 33-144

Columbellidae
Gastropods described in 1843